The Open Balkan is an economic and political zone of three member states in the Balkans, those being Albania, North Macedonia and Serbia. The official languages are Albanian, Macedonian and Serbian. Its administrative centres are the cities of Belgrade, Skopje and Tirana. With the establishment of the zone, all three member states aim to increase trade and cooperation as well as improve bilateral relations.

History 

The idea of the Open Balkan (formerly known as Mini-Schengen Area) came in the early 1990s. It was first mentioned as an economic area between these countries of the Balkan peninsula. The plans were eventually abandoned due to the Yugoslav Wars. The first signs of the Open Balkan emerged in 2018 as a way to improve political relations. The idea of the area was brought by Edi Rama in Berlin when he discussed it with the interested nations. Rama took the idea of the former Prime Minister of Albania Fatos Nano.

The plans for the area were declared on 10 October 2019 in Novi Sad. Two meetings were held, one in Ohrid on 11 November 2019, and the other on 12 December 2019 in Durrës. These countries declared to form a unified market of 12 million people by the end of 2020. On 11 November 2019, at the 2019 Ohrid summit, the President of Serbia, the Prime Ministers of Albania and North Macedonia agreed to create an economic zone, which would further improve political and economic relations and strengthen cultural ties between the nations.

The first meeting was due to be held in January or February 2020 in Belgrade. However, due to the COVID-19 pandemic, the meeting was postponed and a potential date for new meeting in Belgrade was tentatively scheduled for spring or summer 2020.

An Open Balkan leaders summit was held on 2nd of September 2022 in Belgrade. Serbia, North Macedonia and Albania signed several agreements on the exchange of food products, energy, cinematography, as well as cooperation in emergency situations. The countries also agreed to further cooperation and easing tensions in the Balkan region. Montenegrin prime minister Dritan Abazović and the chairman of the council of ministers of Bosnia and Herzegovina Zoran Tegeltija also attended the summit, expressing their wishes for these countries to join the initiative.

The former name referred to the Schengen Area, a common travel area that includes 26 European countries, but not the aforementioned Balkan countries.

Purpose 

The Open Balkan's intentions are to provide greater opportunities for trade, student exchanges, and encourage the EU integration in the member states, inter alia. Citizens of member states will need only an ID card to visit other member states, saving time at border crossings. This economic zone prepares the countries to become members of the European Union.

In this union, goods and capital between these countries would flow quicker and more than 30 million hours would be saved crossing the borders of these three countries every year. The estimate of the World Bank projects savings of $3.2 billion, of which, according to the President Vučić, Serbia would save at least $1.5 billion.

On 29 July 2021, Vučić, Rama and Zaev participated in the forum for regional economic cooperation in Skopje, where they signed agreements on the movement of goods, access to the labor market and cooperation in protection against disasters. It has been agreed mutual acceptance of diplomas and job qualifications, all making work forces more flexible and available and so attracting more investment. As part of the initiative, a regional economic forum attended by some 350 companies, mostly coming from these three countries but also from the wider region, was also held.

Member states 

The Open Balkan currently comprises three member states, including Albania, North Macedonia and Serbia.

Potential members states 

Three potential members are Bosnia and Herzegovina, Montenegro and Kosovo.

Kosovo 
On 4 September 2020, Kosovo agreed to join the Mini-Schengen Area as part of the Kosovo and Serbia economic normalization agreements, but so far has not signed any agreement with three founding countries, even opposing the whole initiative. Prime Minister of Kosovo Albin Kurti rejected the invitation for the summit in Ohrid which is held on June 7–8. Kurti said that "the Open Balkan initiative is a harmful regional initiative with no vision. Kosovo does not want to join in because Serbia is not treating it as an equal side and independent country".

Montenegro 
Prime Minister of Montenegro Dritan Abazović said he supports ‘Open Balkan’ Initiative. Saying “The Open Balkan initiative was made for six countries. Not for five-and-a-half countries or three-and-a-half countries, but for six countries. Everyone who participates represents themselves and their country, I don't know who anyone who likes to wait at the border, I'm not just talking about tourists from Kosovo in Montenegro, but also about Montenegrin citizens who want to go to Serbia, or anywhere in the region."

President of Montenegro Milo Đukanović is opposed to the initiative saying that the Open Balkan was launched at a ”moment of depression” due to German Chancellor Angela Merkel's expected departure and the EU refusal to advance the Balkan countries’ accession bids.

Bosnia and Herzegovina 
Chairman of the Council of Ministers of Bosnia and Herzegovina Zoran Tegeltija expressed  personal support for the initiative, but Bosnia and Herzegovina still lacks a consensus about it for “political reasons”.

Economy 

In 2020, the GDP of these countries combined would be $80.027 billion, GDP PPP would be $207.326 billion. In 2020, GDP per capita would be $6,256, GDP PPP per capita would be $16,658. Albania and North Macedonia would have higher GDP per capita and GDP PPP per capita, and Serbia's GDP/GDP PPP per capita would somewhat decrease. The current currencies are the Albanian lek, the Macedonian denar and the Serbian dinar. The official languages are Albanian, Macedonian and Serbian. The capital cities are Belgrade, Skopje, and Tirana. Some other major cities are Bitola, Čačak, Durrës, Elbasan, Korçë, Kragujevac, Kraljevo, Kruševac, Kumanovo, Leskovac, Niš, Novi Sad, Pančevo, Prilep, Subotica, Shkodër, Vlorë and Zrenjanin.

Statistics

Further cooperation 

On August 2, 2021, the directors of the post offices of Serbia and North Macedonia, Zoran Đorđević and Jani Makraduli signed in Belgrade a Protocol for business cooperation.

On August 3, 2021, by an order of the President of Serbia Aleksandar Vučić, four helicopters of the Ministry of Internal Affairs (Serbia), have been sent to help colleagues from Ministry of Internal Affairs (North Macedonia) for firefighting in North Macedonia.

On May 12, 2022, Serbian Minister of Trade, Tourism and Telecommunications Tatjana Matić talked in Tirana with Albanian Minister of Tourism and Environment Mirela Kumbaro about cooperation within the "Open Balkans" initiative, with an emphasis on removing barriers and reaching an agreement in the field of tourism.

See also 
Accession of Albania to the European Union
Accession of North Macedonia to the European Union
Accession of Serbia to the European Union
Berlin Process
Regional Roaming Agreement
Schengen Area

Notes

References 

Economy of Europe
Expedited border crossing schemes
International border crossings
International organizations based in Europe
International travel documents
Law enforcement in Europe
Multi-speed Europe
Political organizations based in Europe
Schengen Area
Transport and the European Union